Cowa! (stylized as COWA!) is a Japanese manga series written and illustrated by Akira Toriyama. It was serialized in Shueisha's Weekly Shōnen Jump from 1997 to 1998, with the fourteen chapters collected into a single tankōbon volume. The story follows the child monsters Paifu, José and Arpon, and the human Maruyama, as they travel to get medicine to save their town from a deadly flu. Viz Media released the single volume in North America in July 2008. Cowa! was generally well-received by critics, and was nominated for the 2009 Eisner Award for Best Publication for Kids.

Plot
Paifu and José decide to go to the house of a human rumored to be a murderer. Paifu notices what appears to be an orange spirit out in the sea and mistakes it for their friend. They arrive at the light source only to find that it was a torch on a raft belonging to the world-renowned sumo wrestler Maruyama, whom they feared. In spite of becoming acquainted, Maruyama teases Paifu and picks up two sticks producing a cross gesture to scare him off believing he, like some vampires in stories, fear a cross. On the contrary, this action forces Paifu to transform into a rampaging were-koala. His rage is halted by José, who shape-shifts into a round object to revert him back to normal. José tells Maruyama that Paifu can not look at a cross figure for more than three seconds before transforming. When asked by Maruyama about Paifu's father, Paifu replies that he was shot to death in a human city when he shape-shifted into a were-koala. After getting to know a little about Maruyama's past, it turns out that he is not as frightening as rumored to be.

Back in the village, Paifu and José begin to notice a strain of influenza that is spreading in the village affecting only the monsters. On their way to school, they are surprised by Arpon, a monster who considers Paifu to be his eternal enemy. The three exchange a few words which led to Arpon challenging Paifu to a sparring match of kung fu.

Paifu's mother later tells him that school has been canceled for a while due to the serious flu. He celebrates by going to José's home and runs into the village doctor. When the two arrive at the Rodriguez residence to see José's ill father, the doctor's suspicions are confirmed to everyone there and reveals that the cure to the Monster Flu can be created by a witch that resides at the top of Horned-Owl Mountain. The doctor also tells of a forest that one must cross and that a terrible monster dwells along the forest path which leads to the mountain. Due to the adult monsters being sick, Paifu and José volunteer to make the trip and are accompanied by the former sumo wrestler Maruyama, who in actuality, was deceived by Paifu who claimed that the villagers would pay him 1,000,000 yen for his troubles. As the trio are about to leave, Arpon joins the team, exclaiming that he wants to be a hero for the villagers.

With plenty of rest and recuperation, the team pass through a city and arrive around a forest area located by Horned-Owl Mountain. As they near it, Arpon suddenly falls ill by the Monster Flu. They come to a nearby family for aid; in the midst of their troubles, Paifu and Maruyama save them from being attacked by a gang. In exchange, the family cares for the sick Arpon while Paifu, José and Maruyama take off for the forest. Before they leave, they are told by the family of the forest monster's supposed weakness, whistling.

Upon entering the forest, Maruyama has José whistle since he is apparently the only one who can, while Paifu practices his whistling since José will eventually get exhausted. José, instead of getting fatigued from whistling, suddenly falls ill to the Monster Flu as well. Their fear of the monster finding them becomes a reality and they are attacked by the forest monster Baroaba. Maruyama holds his own against the behemoth and tells Paifu to start learning how to whistle immediately before they are killed. Although several attempts had been unsuccessful, Paifu finally prospered in whistling and Baroaba is literally downsized by the sound, proving the weakness true, and is pounded by Maruyama. Before Maruyama finishes him off, he discovers that Baroaba only attacks to protect the forest's rare wildlife; Baroaba apologizes for the misunderstanding and decides to help them get to their destination, the witch's house.

With help from Baroaba, who stays to care for the ill José, Paifu and Maruyama finally reach the summit of the mountain. They then encounter the witch's servant, an oni named Leonardo. After solving a riddle, they are allowed to meet the witch and fortunately retrieved the influenza medicine. On the way down the mountain, Maruyama accidentally slips and falls off. Paifu makes a daring rescue by learning flight at the last minute and saves Maruyama and himself from immediate death. On the way back, Maruyama talks of how he is going to buy a boat with the money he makes forcing Paifu to reveal that he had lied to him about the payment of 1,000,000 yen. Maruyama admits that he is disappointed, but not infuriated as Paifu saved his life. The four are praised as they returned to the village. One month later, Paifu, José and everyone else from the village meet Maruyama out at sea with a ghost boat that all fixed up together.

Characters

Paifu is a half-vampire half-werekoala. When he observes any cross-like figure for more than three seconds, Paifu shapeshifts into a crazed and powerful were-koala and can only change back to his normal state after looking at a round object. Despite being part vampire, he can not fly because he skipped flying practice.

José is a ghost that can fly, turn invisible and change shape.

Maruyama is an overweight human feared by even the monsters in town. He was a sumo wrestler with the ringname  until killing an opponent during a match. Paifu gives him the nickname .

Arpon is a monster boy the constantly challenges Paifu to fights and loses.

The old and forgetful doctor of Batwing Ridge.

The monster that lives in the forest at the foot of Horned-Owl Mountain. He is large with a rubber-like body, unless he hears whistling, in which case he shrinks and loses the rubber-like property.

The assistant of the Witch on top of Horned-Owl Mountain. He either fights or gives a riddle to anyone trying to enter the Witch's house.

Witch living on top Horned-Owl Mountain and maker of the medicine that heals Monster Flu.

Production
Toriyama, who had done only a few one-shots since finishing Dragon Ball in 1995, won handily; it was his first win since Pola & Roid took the top spot in 1981. After winning, Toriyama said he was thinking of creating a "more developed" form of Bubul of Demon Village. He re-tooled the character designs and setting of the one-shot to suit a new series, as detailed in the issue before Cowa!s start.

Despite previously claiming to be done with weekly serials, Toriyama decided to draw Cowa! when he learned his editor would be Kazuhiko Torishima and that he could do things his own way. Unlike both Dr. Slump and Dragon Ball, where he never skipped an issue, he drew Cowa in a three-weeks-on, one-week-off pattern, which afforded him time to rest and work more slowly. Toriyama stated he wanted to draw everything himself, forgoing the customary use of an assistant, even though he had pain in his arm. The story came about from wanting to take a storybook type approach and have the main character be an "unlovable grumpy guy."

Release
Written and illustrated by Akira Toriyama, Cowa! was serialized in Weekly Shōnen Jump magazine from issue #48 of 1997 to #15 of 1998. The fourteen chapters were collected into one tankōbon volume that was released on May 1, 1998 by Shueisha.

Viz Media licensed Cowa! for English release in North America on July 1, 2008. Their graphic novel edition retained the first chapter in color. It has also been released in other countries, such as in France by Glenat, Spain by Planeta DeAgostini, South Korea by Daewon C.I. and Malaysia Comics House.

Chapter list

Reception
About.com's Deb Aoki listed Cowa! as the "Best New All Ages Manga" of 2008, calling it "clever and charming enough to entertain adults as well as younger readers." Anime News Network's Carl Kimlinger disagreed, claiming the plot is not complex enough to appeal to adults. He also wished Viz would have kept the other few chapters that were originally colored as such instead of just the first, as those particular ones were hard to follow in black and white. However, he wrote that "Makoleen's character elevates what might have been a simple children's adventure to a gentle fable about acceptance and understanding." and praised the humor. A.E. Sparrow of IGN gave the series an 8.6 out of 10 and referred to it as a "self-contained mini-epic." On the humor he said "the jokes come at you unapologetically and you're either going to catch them or write them off." Viz Media's English release of Cowa! was nominated for the Eisner Award for Best Publication for Kids in 2009.

References

External links
 

Adventure anime and manga
Akira Toriyama
Comedy anime and manga
Shōnen manga
Shueisha manga
Supernatural anime and manga
Viz Media manga